The Farquhar Atoll is part of the Farquhar Group of islands in the Seychelles that are part of the Outer Islands.

History
The atoll was named in honor of Robert Townsend Farquhar in 1824. Previous visitors had named it after Portuguese explorer João da Nova who commanded that nation's third expedition to India during which he encountered Farquhar (in the year 1504). Administration of the atoll was a grey area for many years, with both Mauritius and Seychelles claiming the right to administer it. In 1881 the authorities in Seychelles suggested Farquhar, along with several other outer islands, be administered from Victoria in Seychelles rather than from Mauritius. There were objections as the owners were based in Mauritius but after considerable argument, the owners lost their case and administration was passed from Mauritius to Seychelles.
Fishing camps were established on north islands in 1850 
In 1960, the village on the northern tip of South Island was abandoned.
From 1965 to the independence of the Seychelles in 1976, Farquhar was a part of the British Indian Ocean Territory.
In 2004 there were renovations in the village.
In 2014 Island Conservation Society opened a Conservation Centre on North Island. On 16 April 2016 Farquhar Atoll was hit by Cyclone Fantala, the strongest tropical cyclone ever recorded in the south-west Indian Ocean, which destroyed most of the buildings except for the cyclone shelter. The Islands Development Company (IDC) has started the rehabilitation of the island and to date has rebuilt the guest house which offers catch and release flyfishing trips that are operated by Alphonse Fishing Company.

Geography
It is the most southerly part of the Seychelles.

List of islands
The main group of islands form a long curve which describes the eastern side of the atoll. Largest of these are North Farquhar and South Farquhar, with the smaller Manaha islands between them.  Farther south is Goëlettes.
To the extreme western side of the atoll lies the island of Sable, and near it a small group known as Trois Islands.

Demographics
There is a small settlement  on North Island.

Administration
The island belongs to Outer Islands District.
Being an island with a small population, there are not any government buildings or services. For many services, people have to go to Victoria, which is a difficult task.

Transport
North Farquhar is bisected by a  paved airfield  that is located near North East Point. The island is occasionally serviced by an Island Development Company (IDC) aircraft from Mahé.
There is a jetty in the settlement

Economics
The inhabitants on the island are engaged in very small scale farming, livestock, salted fish production and coconut processing which include production of copra, pounac and coconut oil. In addition, there is a small guesthouse that caters mainly for fly-fishing clients during October to April.

Flora and fauna
The islands of Farquhar (excluding North, South and the Manahas) have been designated as an Important Bird Area. Goëlettes is the most interesting for birds with a huge seasonal colony of about 300,000 pairs of sooty tern and around 10,000 pairs of brown noddy.  In 2006, Island Conservation Society recorded a previously unknown colony of black-naped terns at Sable Island with 15 breeding pairs, the largest population on any one island in the region. Black-naped terns also breed on Goëlettes.

Farquhar is also an important nesting site for turtles. Surveys conducted in the early 1980s when adult turtles were intensively hunted estimated 425 nesting green turtle females and 27 hawksbill turtles per annum. A survey conducted in 2007 suggests increases in nesting numbers thanks to the protected status of turtles in Seychelles since 1994. Other fauna of interest includes the gold-dust gecko and coconut crab.

Tourism
There is a small lodge on the island that offers catch and release fly fishing trips offered by Alphonse Fishing Company. https://www.alphonsefishingco.com/destinations/farquhar

Image gallery

References

External links 

 Island guide 2
 National Bureau of Statistics
 2007 visit to Farquhar Atoll

Atolls of Seychelles
Outer Islands (Seychelles)
Important Bird Areas of Seychelles
Former islands of the British Indian Ocean Territory